The Cape Government Railways 5th Class 4-6-0 of 1890 was a South African steam locomotive from the pre-Union era in the Cape of Good Hope.

In 1890, the Cape Government Railways placed twenty 5th Class tender locomotives with a 4-6-0 Tenwheeler type wheel arrangement in mainline service on its Midland and Western Systems.

Manufacturer

Twenty 5th Class  Tenwheeler type tender locomotives were delivered to the Cape Government Railways (CGR) from Dübs and Company in 1890. The locomotive was designed by Michael Stephens, Locomotive Superintendent of the Western System of the CGR, and was built to detailed designs prepared by the Salt River drawing office in Cape Town. Of the twenty locomotives in the Class, eighteen went to the Midland System to work out of Port Elizabeth, numbered in the range from 291 to 308. The other two, numbered 119 and 120, went to the Western System for service in the Karoo on the section between Touws River and Beaufort West.

Characteristics
The locomotive was a larger and improved version of the earlier 4th Class  locomotive.

Compared to the second batch of 5th Class locomotives which were to be delivered a year later in 1891, it had a short smokebox on which the chimney was so close to the front of the smokebox that the headlight had to be mounted on a platform, attached to the front of the smokebox. The smokeboxes were later extended to suit South Africa's low-grade coal and to make room for wire-netting spark arresters.

Service

Cape Government Railways
The 5th Class proved to be very useful engines and were considered the first really efficient all-round locomotives in the Cape of Good Hope. They were used wherever the mainline had severe gradients and curves. Because of their greater power, the older 4th Class locomotives were gradually relegated to secondary duties.

Oranje-Vrijstaat Gouwerment-Spoorwegen
In late 1896, eight of the Midland System's locomotives were sold to the newly established Oranje-Vrijstaat Gouwerment-Spoorwegen (OVGS), where they were designated 5th Class K and renumbered in the range from 41 to 48.

Central South African Railways
During the Second Boer War, control of all railways in the Orange Free State was taken over by the Imperial Military Railways. At the end of the war in 1902, the eight ex-OVGS locomotives came onto the roster of the Central South African Railways (CSAR), where they were renumbered in the range from 318 to 325.

In 1904, the CSAR reboilered two of these locomotives, numbers 319 and 322, with larger boilers and Belpaire fireboxes which were equipped with Drummond tubes. Since, by then, these locomotives were being withdrawn from mainline traffic, no more such reboilerings were carried out.

South African Railways
When the Union of South Africa was established on 31 May 1910, the three Colonial government railways, the CGR, the Natal Government Railways and the CSAR, were united under a single administration to control and administer the railways, ports and harbours of the Union. Although the South African Railways and Harbours came into existence in 1910, the actual classification and renumbering of all the rolling stock of the three constituent railways was only implemented with effect from 1 January 1912.

By 1912, sixteen of these locomotives survived, twelve on the CGR and four, including the two which had been reboilered, on the CSAR. They were considered obsolete by the South African Railways (SAR), designated Class 05 and renumbered by having the numeral 0 prefixed to their existing numbers.

During 1914, at the outbreak of the First World War, military planners followed the example set by the British invading forces during the Second Boer War and identified a requirement for armoured trains. For this purpose, five Class 05 locomotives were specially protected with armour plate and named Trafalgar, Scot, Erin, Karoo and Schrikmaker. The armour-plating was fitted by the workshops in Pretoria, Bloemfontein and Salt River. Their engine numbers are not known, nor whether they were from this Class or the Class 05 of 1891 or both.

In spite of being considered obsolete, some of the Class 05 locomotives survived as shunting engines in SAR service for another four decades, with some even getting reboilered while in SAR service. One confirmed example is no. 0506, which was still equipped with boiler no. 7244 of 1924 when it was withdrawn from service in the 1950s.

When they were eventually withdrawn in 1953, the Class 05 locomotives were the last of the obsolete engines to be still in SAR service.

Works numbers
The works numbers, CGR System, original numbers, renumbering and distribution of the Cape 5th Class of 1890 are listed in the table.

Illustration

References

0370
0370
4-6-0 locomotives
2′C n2 locomotives
Dübs locomotives
Cape gauge railway locomotives
Railway locomotives introduced in 1890
1890 in South Africa
Scrapped locomotives